The 2001 Netanya bombing was a suicide bombing which occurred on March 4, 2001 at the center of the business district of Netanya, Israel. Three people were killed in the attack and over 60 people were injured.

Attack
On Sunday, March 4, 2001, shortly before 9:00 am, a Palestinian suicide bomber wearing an explosive belt hidden underneath his clothes detonated the explosive device at a busy intersection in the center of the business district of Netanya, Israel. The force of the blast killed three civilians and injured over 60 people.

Perpetrators
After the attack, the Palestinian Islamist militant group Hamas claimed responsibility for the attack and stated that the attack was carried out by a 23-year-old Palestinian named Ahmed Alyan who was a resident of the West Bank.

Official reactions
Involved parties
:
 Israeli Prime Minister Ariel Sharon stated that "the terror attack is a very serious one that shows that the Palestinian Authority is not taking the necessary steps"

:
 Ahmed Yassin, the spiritual leader of the Hamas, stated that Hamas would continue to attack Israel until the Israeli occupation will be  eradicated and stated that Israelis would "pay a price in accordance with the price paid by the Palestinian people."

International
 : French officials condemned the attack in Netanya, but at the same time urged Israel to end the blockade on the Palestinian territories.
 : The Bush administration condemned the attack and requested that Arafat will arrest those responsible for the attack.

References

External links
 Terror bomb injures 15 at Israeli market - published on March 4, 2001 on the New York Post
 Sharon accuses Arafat forces of involvement in bombing - published on March 4, 2001 on RTÉ.ie
 Bomb In Israeli Coastal City Kills 4 - published on March 4, 2001 on Herald-Journal
 Blast Hits Israeli Market, kills 2 - published on March 4, 2001 on Eugene Register-Guard

Terrorist incidents in Israel in 2001
March 2001 events in Asia
Hamas suicide bombings
Islamic terrorism in Israel
2001 murders in Israel